Nandrolone acetate, also known as 19-nortestosterone 17β-acetate or as estr-4-en-17β-ol-3-one 17β-acetate, is a synthetic, injected anabolic–androgenic steroid (AAS) and a derivative of 19-nortestosterone (nandrolone) that was never marketed. It is an androgen ester – specifically, the C17β acetate ester of nandrolone.

See also
 List of androgen esters § Nandrolone esters

References

Abandoned drugs
Acetate esters
Androgens and anabolic steroids
Nandrolone esters
Progestogens
World Anti-Doping Agency prohibited substances